"Hitchcock & Scully" is the second episode of the sixth season of the American television police sitcom series Brooklyn Nine-Nine, and the 114th overall episode of the series. The episode was written by Lang Fisher and directed by Cortney Carrillo.

In the episode, Jake and Charles investigate a case from Hitchcock and Scully's younger days to determine if the two older detectives are withholding stolen cash. Due to Holt's campaign against John Kelly, the Commissioner closes off the lower level and forces most of the departments to work in a tight space, leading Amy and her officers into conflict with Terry and Rosa. Gina helps Holt prepare for a television interview but ends up taking it herself.

Plot
The episode starts off with a flashback to 1986 in which a young Scully (Alan Ritchson), and a young Hitchcock (Wyatt Nash) take down mafia boss Gio Costa (Daniel Di Tomasso) with the help of Marissa Costa (Decker Sadowski), Gio's wife. The episode cuts to the present day with Captain Holt (Andre Braugher) calling Jake Peralta (Andy Samberg) and Charles Boyle (Joe Lo Truglio) into his office to tell them that Hitchcock (Dirk Blocker) and Scully (Joel McKinnon Miller) were contacted by someone in Internal Affairs who has reopened the case. Holt suspects that Commissioner Kelly (Phil Reeves) is trying to create a scandal and sends Jake and Charles to reevaluate the case. Jake and Charles interrogate Hitchcock and Scully. Hitchcock tells Jake that they took down Gio, then intercepted a ton of coke and three duffel bags full of cash. However, a photo from the night of the bust shows Hitchcock and Scully with four duffel bags. The detectives then defensively suggest they missed the fourth bag. Jake, suspicious of the duo, decides to continue with the investigation.

In an attempt to prove their innocence, Hitchcock and Scully both turn over their financial records, revealing that Hitchcock has a monthly parking spot for "The Beaver Trap", an old sex van that Hitchcock uses as a home between marriages. Jake and Charles go into the van to find the fourth duffel bag empty. Hitchcock and Scully then lock them in the van and escape in Jake’s car. Jake and Charles drive the van to find Hitchcock and Scully at "Wing Slutz" –a restaurant that they patronize frequently. Jake and Charles confront Hitchcock and Scully but the manager steps in and reveals herself to be Marissa. Hitchcock and Scully tell Jake and Charles that Marissa was their criminal informant in the mafia and that they stole the money for her after their captain refused to place her in witness protection. A call comes from Holt saying that Internal Affairs never reopened the case and it was highly likely that Hitchcock and Scully were called by Gio Costa himself. The mafia then shows up having tracked their location although the squad shows up and subdues Costa. Costa gets hold of a gun and fires shots at Marissa, but Hitchcock and Scully jump in front of her, stopping the bullets with tubs of "slut sauce" that they had strapped to their bodies in place of bulletproof vests.

While investigating Hitchcock and Scully, Charles informs Jake that he’s on the verge of adopting Nikolaj’s half-brother Dragomir. Dragomir claims to be a 15-year-old but Jake finds a photo of him which shows that he is a 42-year-old fur trapper. Charles eventually gets in touch with Nikolaj’s orphanage and confirms the existence of a 34-year-old half-brother, who will be visiting soon. Meanwhile at the precinct, tensions escalate among the "upstairs people", consisting of Terry (Terry Crews) and the detective squad, and the "downstairs people", i.e. Amy (Melissa Fumero) and her uniformed officers, and Holt prepares for a television interview where he intends to speak out against Kelly’s new initiatives for the NYPD. Holt misses his interview to help Hitchcock, Scully, Jake, and Charles. Gina (Chelsea Peretti) fills in for him and is proud to break a record for most viewer complaints. Holt apologizes to the squad for his shortsightedness in his pursuit of justice. The final scene is another flashback which reveals that Hitchcock and Scully's physiques as well as attitudes towards work declined after they got hooked on Wing Slutz while checking in on Marissa.

Reception

Viewers
According to Nielsen Media Research, "Hitchcock & Scully" was seen by an estimated 2.83 million household viewers and gained a 0.9/5 share among adults aged 18–49, beating The Good Place and Gotham but behind Law & Order: Special Victims Unit and The Big Bang Theory.

Critical reviews
LaToya Ferguson of The A.V. Club gave the episode an "B+" grade and wrote "from the cold open, the episode is instantly a strange success".

Alan Sepinwall of Rolling Stone praised the episode for taking a more in-depth look into the background of the pair.

References

External links

2019 American television episodes
Brooklyn Nine-Nine (season 6) episodes